Euophrys terrestris is a species of jumping spider.

References

Salticidae
Spiders of Europe
Spiders described in 1871